Lucerapex cracens is a species of sea snail, a marine gastropod mollusk in the family Turridae, the turrids.

Distribution
This marine species occurs off the Solomon Islands.

References

 Kantor Yu.I., Fedosov A.E. & Puillandre N. (2018). New and unusual deep-water Conoidea revised with shell, radula and DNA characters. Ruthenica. 28(2): 47-82.

cracens
Gastropods described in 2018